The 1945–46 SM-sarja season was the 15th season of the SM-sarja, the top level of ice hockey in Finland. Nine teams participated in the league, and Ilves Tampere won the championship.

Regular season

External links
 Season on hockeyarchives.info

Liiga seasons
Fin
1945–46 in Finnish ice hockey